Tremarctos is a genus of the bear subfamily Tremarctinae, endemic to Americas from the Pliocene to recent. The northern species, the Florida short-faced bear, became extinct 11,000 years ago. The sole living Tremarctos species is the South American spectacled bear.

Species

 †Tremarctos floridanus - Florida short-faced bear
 Tremarctos ornatus - spectacled bear

References

Bears
Mammal genera
Mammal genera with one living species
Taxa named by Paul Gervais
Extant Pliocene first appearances
Fossil taxa described in 1855